New Horizon may refer to:

Education 
 New Horizon (textbook), an English language textbook used by junior high school students in Japan
 New Horizon College of Engineering, an engineering college in Bangalore, India
 New Horizon Public School, ICSE School, in 100ft road, Indiranagar, Bangalore, India
 New Horizon Montessori School, an elementary school in Louisville, Tennessee, U.S.
 New Horizon Scholars School, a pre-primary, primary and secondary school in Navi Mumbai, India
 New Horizon School, a school for Muslim religious education in southern California, founded by Ahmad Adaya

Music 
 New Horizon Records, the label of GFK

Albums
 New Horizon (The Answer album) or the title song, 2013
 New Horizon (The Country Gentlemen album), 1992
 New Horizon (Isaac Hayes album), 1977
 New Horizon (JK Flesh album), 2018
 New Horizon (MYMP album), 2006
 New Horizon (Tak Matsumoto album) or the title song, 2014
 Aria Volume 2 - New Horizon, a compilation album in the Café del Mar Aria series, 1999
 new horizon (Hiro Takahashi album), 1995

Songs
 "New Horizon", by Frijid Pink from Earth Omen, 1972
 "New Horizon", by Midnattsol from Nordlys, 2008
 "New Horizon", by Royal Southern Brotherhood from Royal Southern Brotherhood, 2012
 "New Horizon", by Section 25 from Always Now, 1981
 "New Horizon (I Found You)", by Outrage from Outraged, 2013
 "A New Horizon", by Loose Ends from So Where Are You?, 1985
 "A New Horizon", by Xavier Naidoo & Naturally 7 from the Animals United soundtrack, 2010
 "A New Horizon - Tavnazian Archipelago", from the Final Fantasy XI Chains of Promathia Original Soundtrack, 2004

Other uses 
 New Horizon (film), 1940 Soviet drama film
 New Horizon Interactive, now Disney Online Studios Canada, an interactive graphics software company
 RV New Horizon, a research vessel of the Scripps Institution of Oceanography, San Diego
 Ulmus 'New Horizon', an elm hybrid
 A New Horizon, a 1990 documentary film by Nirad N. Mohapatra
 New Horizon, a novel by Abdur Rouf Choudhury
 New Horizon Buses, bus company based in Brightlingsea

See also 

 
 New Horizons (disambiguation)
 Horizon (disambiguation)
 New (disambiguation)